Frank Mills (March 20, 1904 – November 11, 1969) was a former member of the Ohio House of Representatives. He died while in office in 1969.

References

1904 births
Republican Party members of the Ohio House of Representatives
1969 deaths
20th-century American politicians